The , also Lewchewan or Luchuan, are the indigenous languages of the Ryukyu Islands, the southernmost part of the Japanese archipelago. Along with the Japanese language and the Hachijō language, they make up the Japonic language family.

Although Japanese is spoken in the Ryukyu Islands, the Ryukyu and Japanese languages are not mutually intelligible. It is not known how many speakers of these languages remain, but language shift toward the use of Standard Japanese and dialects like Okinawan Japanese has resulted in these languages becoming endangered; UNESCO labels four of the languages "definitely endangered" and two others "severely endangered".

Overview
Phonologically, the Ryukyuan languages have some cross-linguistically unusual features. Southern Ryukyuan languages have a number of syllabic consonants, including unvoiced syllabic fricatives (e.g. Ōgami Miyako   'breast'). Glottalized consonants are common (e.g. Yuwan Amami   "horse"). Some Ryukyuan languages have phonemic central vowels, e.g. Yuwan Amami  "tree". Ikema Miyako has a voiceless nasal phoneme . Many Ryukyuan languages, like Standard Japanese and most Japanese dialects, have contrastive pitch accent.

Ryukyuan languages are generally SOV, dependent-marking, modifier-head, nominative-accusative languages, like Japanese. Adjectives are generally bound morphemes, occurring either with noun compounding or using verbalization. Many Ryukyuan languages mark both nominatives and genitives with the same marker. This marker has the unusual feature of changing form depending on an animacy hierarchy. The Ryukyuan languages have topic and focus markers, which may take different forms depending on the sentential context. Ryukyuan also preserves a special verbal inflection for clauses with focus markers—this unusual feature was also found in Old Japanese, but lost in Modern Japanese.

Classification and varieties
The Ryukyuan languages belong to the Japonic language family, related to the Japanese language. The Ryukyuan languages are not mutually intelligible with Japanese—in fact, they are not even mutually intelligible with each other—and thus are usually considered separate languages. However, for socio-political and ideological reasons, they have often been classified within Japan as dialects of Japanese. Since the beginning of World War II, most mainland Japanese have regarded the Ryukyuan languages as a dialect or group of dialects of Japanese.

The Okinawan language is only 71% lexically similar to, or cognate with, standard Japanese. Even the southernmost Japanese dialect (Kagoshima dialect) is only 72% cognate with the northernmost Ryukyuan language (Amami). The Kagoshima dialect of Japanese, however, is 80% lexically similar to Standard Japanese. There is general agreement among linguistics experts that Ryukyuan varieties can be divided into six languages, conservatively, with dialects unique to islands within each group also sometimes considered languages.

A widely accepted hypothesis among linguists categorizes the Ryukyuan languages into two groups, Northern Ryukyuan (Amami–Okinawa) and Southern Ryukyuan (Miyako–Yaeyama). Many speakers of the Amami, Miyako, Yaeyama and Yonaguni languages may also be familiar with Okinawan since Okinawan has the most speakers and once acted as the regional standard. Speakers of Yonaguni are also likely to know the Yaeyama language due to its proximity. Since Amami, Miyako, Yaeyama, and Yonaguni are less urbanized than the Okinawan mainland, their languages are not declining as quickly as that of Okinawa proper, and some children continue to be brought up in these languages.

 Northern Ryukyuan languages
 Amami
 Kikai
 Amami Ōshima
 Northern
 Southern
 Tokunoshima
 Kunigami
 Okinoerabu
 Yoron
 Kunigami
 Okinawan
 Southern Ryukyuan languages
 Miyakoan
Central Miyako
Irabu
Tarama
 Yaeyama
 Yonaguni

Each Ryukyuan language is generally unintelligible to others in the same family. There is wide diversity among them. For example, Yonaguni has only three vowels, whereas varieties of Amami may have up to seven, excluding length distinctions. The table below illustrates the different phrases used in each language for "thank you" and "welcome", with standard Japanese provided for comparison.

Status

There is no census data for the Ryukyuan languages, and the number of speakers is unknown. As of 2005, the total population of the Ryukyu region was 1,452,288, but fluent speakers are restricted to the older generation, generally in their 50s or older, and thus the true number of Ryukyuan speakers should be much lower.

The six Ryukyuan languages are listed in the UNESCO Atlas of the World's Languages in Danger. UNESCO said all Ryukyuan languages are on course for extinction by 2050.

Starting in the 1890s, the Japanese government began to suppress the Ryukyuan languages as part of their policy of forced assimilation in the islands.

Children being raised in the Ryukyuan languages are becoming increasingly rare throughout the islands, and usually only occurs when the children are living with their grandparents. The Ryukyuan languages are still used in traditional cultural activities, such as folk music, folk dance, poem and folk plays. There has also been a radio news program in the Naha dialect since 1960.

Circa 2007, in Okinawa, people under the age of 40 have little proficiency in the native Okinawan language. A new mixed language, based on Japanese and Okinawan, has developed, known as "Okinawan Japanese". Although it has been largely ignored by linguists and language activists, this is the language of choice among the younger generation.

Similarly, the common language now used in everyday conversations in Amami Ōshima is not the traditional Amami language, but rather a regional variation of Amami-accented Japanese, known as Amami Japanese.

Each island has its own name for the event:
On Kikaijima it is 
On Okinoerabujima it is 
Yoronjima's fu (2) tu (10) ba (8) is the goroawase source of the February 18 date, much like with Okinawa Prefecture's use of kutuba.

History

It is generally accepted that the Ryukyu Islands were populated by Proto-Japonic speakers in the first millennium, and since then relative isolation allowed the Ryukyuan languages to diverge significantly from the varieties of Proto-Japonic spoken in Mainland Japan, which would later be known as Old Japanese. However, the discoveries of the Pinza-Abu Cave Man, the Minatogawa Man, and the Yamashita Cave Man as well as the Shiraho Saonetabaru Cave Ruins suggest an earlier arrival to the island by modern humans. Some researchers suggest that the Ryukyuan languages are most likely to have evolved from a "pre-Proto-Japonic language" from the Korean peninsula. However, Ryukyuan may have already begun to diverge from Proto-Japonic before this migration, while its speakers still dwelt in the main islands of Japan. After this initial settlement, there was little contact between the main islands and the Ryukyu Islands for centuries, allowing Ryukyuan and Japanese to diverge as separate linguistic entities from each other. This situation lasted until the Kyushu-based Satsuma Domain conquered the Ryukyu Islands in the 17th century.

The Ryukyu Kingdom retained autonomy until 1879, when it was annexed by Japan. The Japanese government adopted a policy of forced assimilation, appointing mainland Japanese to political posts and suppressing native culture and language. Students caught speaking the Ryukyuan languages were made to wear a dialect card (方言札 hōgen fuda), a method of public humiliation. Students who regularly wore the card would receive corporal punishment. In 1940, there was a political debate amongst Japanese leaders about whether or not to continue the oppression of the Ryukyuan languages, although the argument for assimilation prevailed. In the World War II era, speaking the Ryukyuan languages was officially illegal, although in practice the older generation was still monolingual.  During the Battle of Okinawa, many Okinawans were labeled as spies and executed for speaking the Okinawan language. This policy of linguicide lasted into the post-war occupation of the Ryukyu Islands by the United States. As the American occupation forces generally promoted the reforming of a separate Ryukyuan culture, many Okinawan officials continued to strive for Japanification as a form of defiance.

Nowadays, in favor of multiculturalism, preserving Ryukyuan languages has become the policy of Okinawa Prefectural government, as well as the government of Kagoshima Prefecture's Ōshima Subprefecture. However, the situation is not very optimistic, since the vast majority of Okinawan children are now monolingual in Japanese.

Geographic distribution
The Ryukyuan languages are spoken on the Ryukyu Islands, which comprise the southernmost part of the Japanese archipelago There are four major island groups which make up the Ryukyu Islands: the Amami Islands, the Okinawa Islands, the Miyako Islands, and the Yaeyama Islands. The former is in the Kagoshima Prefecture, while the latter three are in the Okinawa Prefecture.

Orthography

Older Ryukyuan texts are often found on stone inscriptions. Tamaudun-no-Hinomon (玉陵の碑文 "Inscription of Tamaudun tomb") (1501), for example. Within the Ryukyu Kingdom, official texts were written in kanji and hiragana, derived from Japan. However, this was a sharp contrast from Japan at the time, where classical Chinese writing was mostly used for official texts, only using hiragana for informal ones. Classical Chinese writing was sometimes used in Ryukyu as well, read in kundoku (Ryukyuan) or in Chinese. In Ryukyu, katakana was hardly used.

Historically, official documents in Ryukyuan were primarily written in a form of classical Chinese writing known as Kanbun, while poetry and songs were often written in the Shuri dialect of Okinawan.

Commoners did not learn kanji. Omoro Sōshi (1531–1623), a noted Ryukyuan song collection, was mainly written in hiragana. Other than hiragana, they also used Suzhou numerals (sūchūma すうちゅうま in Okinawan), derived from China. In Yonaguni in particular, there was a different writing system, the Kaidā glyphs (カイダー字 or カイダーディー). Under Japanese influence, all of those numerals became obsolete.

Nowadays, perceived as "dialects", Ryukyuan languages are not often written. When they are, Japanese characters are used in an ad hoc manner. There are no standard orthographies for the modern languages. Sounds not distinguished in the Japanese writing system, such as glottal stops, are not properly written. Sometimes local kun'yomi are given to kanji, such as agari (あがり "east") for 東, iri (いり "west") for 西, thus 西表 is Iriomote.

Okinawa Prefectural government set up the investigative commission for orthography of shimakutuba in 2018, and the commission proposed an unified spelling rule based on katakana for languages of Kunigami, Okinawa, Miyako, Yaeyama and Yonaguni on May 30 in 2022.

Phonology
Ryukyuan languages often share many phonological features with Japanese, including a voicing opposition for obstruents, CV(C) syllable structure, moraic rhythm, and pitch accent. However, many individual Ryukyuan languages diverge significantly from this pan-Japonic base. For instance, Ōgami does not have phonemic voicing in obstruents, allows CCVC syllables, and has unusual syllabic consonants such as   "make".

Consonants
The Northern Ryukyuan (Amami-Okinawa) languages are notable for having glottalic consonants. Phonemically these are analyzed of consisting of a cluster  + C, where the consonant  consists of its own mora. For instance, in the Amami dialect Yuwan the word   "horse" is bimoraic. Tsuken (Central Okinawan) restricts glottalization to glides and the vowels . Southern Ryukyuan mostly has little to no glottalization, with some exceptions (e.g. Yonaguni).

Southern Ryukyuan stands out in having a number of syllabic consonants. These consonants are contextually nucleic, becoming syllabic when not adjacent to a vowel. Examples:

Irabu Miyako:
   "wave"
   "shell"
   "potato"
   "man"
   "daytime"
Ōgami Miyako
   "cow"
   "dust"
   "breast"

Ōgami even shows a three-way length distinction in fricatives, though across a syllable boundary:
   "child"
   "grass"
   "comb", "top"

Ikema (a Miyako dialect) has a voiceless moraic nasal phoneme , which always precedes another nasal onset and assimilates its place of articulation to the following nasal.

Vowels
Amami has high and mid central vowels.

Suprasegmentals
The Ryukyuan languages operate based on the mora. Most Ryukyuan languages require words to be at least bimoraic, thus for example in Hateruma the underlying noun root  "hand" becomes  when it is an independent noun, though it remains as  when attached to a clitic, e.g. . However, the syllable may still sometimes be relevant—for instance, the Ōgami topic marker takes a different form after open syllables with short vowels:
 "staff"  → 
 "vegetable"  → 
 "person"  → 

Ryukyuan languages typically have a pitch accent system where some mora in a word bears the pitch accent. They commonly either have two or three distinctive types of pitch accent which may be applied. The category of foot also has relevance to the accentual systems of some Ryukyuan languages, and some Miyako varieties have a cross-linguistically rare system of tonal foot. However, Irabu Miyakoan does not have lexical accent.

Grammar

Morphology

The Ryukyuan languages consistently distinguish between the word classes of nouns and verbs, distinguished by the fact that verbs take inflectional morphology. Property-concept (adjectival) words are generally bound morphemes. One strategy they use is compounding with a free-standing noun:

Ikema:

Yuwan:

Compounding is found in both Northern and Southern Ryukyuan, but is mostly absent from Hateruma (Yaeyama).

Another way property stems are used is by verbalization:

Yuwan Amami:

Miyako is unique in having stand-alone adjectives. These may be formed by reduplication of the root, e.g. Irabu Miyako imi- "small" → imii-imi "small (adj.)". They may also be compounded with a grammaticalized noun munu "thing", e.g. Irabu imi-munu 'small (thing)'.

Syntax
Ryukyuan languages are generally SOV, dependent-marking, modifier-head, nominative-accusative languages. They are also pro-drop languages. All of these features are shared with the Japanese language.

In many Ryukyuan languages, the nominative and genitive are marked identically, a system also found, for example, in Austronesian languages. However, Ryukyuan has the unusual feature that these markers vary based on an animacy hierarchy. Typically there are two markers of the form =ga and =nu, which are distinguished based on animacy and definiteness. In Yuwan Amami, for instance, the nominative is marked with =ga/=nu and the genitive by =ga/=nu/=Ø based on the following hierarchy:

In the Miyako varieties, the object in a dependent clause of clause-chaining constructions has a special marker, homophonous to a topic marker. This might even be interpreted as another function of the topic marker.

Hateruma Yaeyama stands out in that it is a zero-marking language, where word order rather than case marking is important:

The Ryukyuan languages mark both topic and focus grammatically. The typical form of the topic marker is =, or in Southern Ryukyuan =ba; the typical focus marker is =du. In some Ryukyuan languages there are many focus markers with different functions; for instance, Irabu has =du in declarative clauses, =ru in yes-no interrogative clauses, and =ga in wh-interrogative clauses. The focus markers trigger a special verbal inflection—this typologically unusual focus construction, known as kakari-musubi, was also found in Old Japanese, but has been lost in Modern Japanese.

Examples from Yuwan Amami:

While in many Japonic languages this special inflection is often identical to the verbal inflection in relative clauses, in Yuwan Amami is different (the relative inflection is -n/-tan). There is some variation among the Ryukyuan languages as to the form of kakari-musubi—for example, in Irabu Miyako a focus marker blocks a specific verb form, rather than triggering a special inflection.

Pronouns
Thorpe (1983) reconstructs the following pronouns in Proto-Ryukyuan. For the first person, the singular and plural are assumed based on the Yonaguni reflex.
 *a, "I" (singular)
 *wa "we" (plural)
 *u, *e "you" (singular)
 *uya, *ura "you" (plural)

Cultural vocabulary
Pellard (2015) reconstructs the following cultural vocabulary words for Proto-Ryukyuan.
 *kome B 'rice'
 *mai A 'rice'
 *ine B 'rice plant'
 *momi A 'unhulled rice'
 *mogi B 'wheat'
 *awa B 'foxtail millet'
 *kimi B 'broomcorn millet'
 *umo B 'taro, yam'
 * C 'field'
 *ta B 'rice paddy'
 *usi A 'cow'
 *uwa C 'pig'
 *uma B 'horse'
 *tubo A 'pot'
 *kame C 'jar'
 *pune C 'boat'
 *po A 'sail'
 * B 'paddle'

See also 
Ryūka
Jōmon

Notes

References

Bibliography

Further reading
Sanseido (1997). 言語学大辞典セレクション：日本列島の言語 (Selection from the Encyclopædia of Linguistics: The Languages of the Japanese Archipelago). "琉球列島の言語" (The Languages of the Ryukyu Islands).
Ashworth, D. E. (1975). A generative study of the inflectional morphophonemics of the Shuri dialect of Ryukyuan. Thesis (Ph. D.)—Cornell University, 1973.

Heinrich, Patrick, Shinsho Miyara, Michinori Shimoji, eds. 2015. Handbook of the Ryukyuan Languages. Berlin: De Gruyter Mouton.
Serafim, L. A. (1985). Shodon: the prehistory of a Northern Ryukyuan dialect of Japanese. [S.l: s.n.
Shimabukuro, Moriyo. 2007. The accentual history of the Japanese and Ryukyuan languages: a reconstruction. Languages of Asia series, v. 2. Folkestone, Kent: Global Oriental. 

Uemura, Yukio, and Wayne P. Lawrence. 2003. The Ryukyuan language. Endangered Languages of the Pacific Rim (Series), A4-018. Osaka, Japan: ELPR.

External links

 Ryukyuan language phonetic database 
 Documents about Shima kutuba, Okinawa Prefecture
 Web archives of Okinawan Folktales, Okinawa Prefectural Museum
 What is a dialect?, Amami Culture Foundation
 Database of Endangered Languages of Japan, National Institute for Japanese Language and Linguistics
 伊波普猷文庫目録 
 仲宗根政善言語資料
 うちなあぐち
メーラムニ用語便覧
おーりたぼーり：メーラム二（宮良言葉）の学習者のためのポッドキャスト 

 
Languages of Japan
Ryukyu Islands
Culture in Okinawa Prefecture